Has Been (2004) is William Shatner's second musical album after 1968's The Transformed Man. The album was produced and arranged by Ben Folds and most of the songs are co-written by Folds and Shatner, with Folds creating arrangements for Shatner's prose-poems. The album features guest appearances from Joe Jackson (on a cover of Pulp's "Common People"), Folds and Aimee Mann (backup vocals on "That's Me Trying"), Lemon Jelly (on "Together"), Henry Rollins, Adrian Belew (on "I Can't Get Behind That"), and Brad Paisley (on "Real", which he wrote specifically for Shatner).

History
Joe Jackson explained his involvement in an interview, saying, "That came through Ben Folds, who's a big fan of mine. You’d have to ask him how he got hooked up with Bill Shatner, I don't remember. But I think he did a really great job of putting an album behind Shatner that is fun and not completely cheesy, though when it is too cheesy, it's deliberately so. (laughs) It's just a very musically satisfying record, and when he asked me to be a part of it, why would I not?  How could I refuse? I went to Nashville for a few days and hung out with the two of them, and we created a couple of masterpieces." He ultimately said about working with Shatner, "He's wonderful, very musical, and very funny, because he's so obviously in on the joke".

Originally, Weezer and former U.S. President Bill Clinton were set to be featured on the album but by the time Weezer responded, Clinton had already backed out.

In 2007, a ballet called Common People, set to Has Been, was created by Margo Sappington (of Oh! Calcutta! fame) and performed by the Milwaukee Ballet. Shatner attended the première and had the event filmed. This footage became William Shatner's Gonzo Ballet, a feature film which premiered at the Nashville Film Festival on April 17, 2009.  The documentary also features interviews with Shatner, Folds, and Henry Rollins.

Track listing
 "Common People" (Nick Banks, Jarvis Cocker, Candida Doyle, Steve Mackey, Russell Senior) with Joe Jackson on vocals – 4:40
 "It Hasn't Happened Yet" (Folds, Shatner) – 3:49
 "You'll Have Time" (Folds, Shatner) – 5:18
 "That's Me Trying" (Folds, Nick Hornby) with Aimee Mann on vocals – 3:48
 "What Have You Done" (Shatner) – 1:46
 "Together" (Lemon Jelly, Elizabeth Shatner, William Shatner) – 5:39
 "Familiar Love" (Folds, Shatner) – 4:00
 "Ideal Woman" (Folds, Shatner) – 2:23
 "Has Been" (Folds, Shatner) – 2:18
 "I Can't Get Behind That" (Folds, Henry Rollins, Shatner) with Adrian Belew on guitar – 3:00
 "Real" (Brad Paisley) with Brad Paisley– 3:08

Charts

Album

Song

See also
William Shatner's musical career

References

External links

2004 albums
William Shatner albums
Shout! Factory albums
Albums produced by Ben Folds